The 2019 Major League Rugby Final was the championship match of the 2nd season of Major League Rugby (MLR), a rugby union club competition in the United States. It was played on June 16, 2019, at Torero Stadium in San Diego, California, between the San Diego Legion and the Seattle Seawolves.

San Diego and Seattle finished first and second in the regular season, respectively, and advanced to the final after defeating New York and Toronto in the semifinals. The Seattle team was the defending champion, having won the 2018 final. Seattle defeated San Diego 26–23 in the 2019 final to take their second championship title.

Background

The 2019 Major League Rugby season began in January 2019 with nine teams all playing each other home and away. The Seattle Seawolves won the previous season's championship, defeating the Glendale Raptors at Torero Stadium in San Diego.

Seattle and San Diego played each other twice during the regular season, ending in 17–13 and 28–22 victories for the Legion.

Venue

Torero Stadium, home field of Major League Rugby team San Diego Legion, was selected as the venue for the final after the team finished as the top seed in the regular season. The stadium with a seating capacity of 6,000 on the campus of the University of San Diego is also home to the various athletics teams of the university.

Broadcasting

The match was broadcast nationally on CBS. It received a rating of 0.34 (510,000).

Match

Details

Post-match

The defending champion Seattle Seawolves was once again awarded the "America's Championship Shield", which was changed to a  metal shield in the shape of the MLR logo. Seawolves scrum-half JP Smith was named the MLR Championship Series "man of the match".

References

Major League Rugby Finals
2019 in American rugby union
Rugby union matches